Repusudan Dayal (born on 18 May 1941) is an Indian Judge, Lokayukta and former Chief Justice of the Sikkim High Court.

Career
Dayal joined in the Uttar Pradesh Judicial Service on 22 February 1966. In 1975 he became the additional Judge of Small Cause Court, New Delhi. He was appointed Additional and District Sessions Judge in 1979. On 10 May 1984, Dayal became a Judge of the Sikkim High Court, thereafter transferred to Allahabad High Court on 18 October 1995. He also served as the Judge of the Calcutta High Court in 1997. On 3 February 1999 Justice Dayal was elevated to the post of the Chief Justice of the Sikkim High Court and served there till 17 May 2003. He was appointed Chairman of Sikkim State Law Commission and Sikkim State Human Rights Commission after retirement. He also became the Madhya Pradesh Lokayukta.

References

1941 births
Living people
Indian judges
Judges of the Calcutta High Court
Judges of the Allahabad High Court
Chief Justices of the Sikkim High Court
20th-century Indian judges
21st-century Indian judges
Judges of the Sikkim High Court
Ombudsmen in India